Carl Richard Hagen (born 2 February 1937) is a professor of particle physics at the University of Rochester. He is most noted for his contributions to the Standard Model and Symmetry breaking as well as the 1964 co-discovery of the Higgs mechanism and Higgs boson with Gerald Guralnik and Tom Kibble (GHK).  As part of Physical Review Letters 50th anniversary celebration, the journal recognized this discovery as one of the milestone papers in PRL history. While widely considered to have authored the most complete of the early papers on the Higgs theory, GHK were controversially not included in the 2013 Nobel Prize in Physics.

In 2010, Hagen was awarded The American Physical Society's J. J. Sakurai Prize for Theoretical Particle Physics for the "elucidation of the properties of spontaneous symmetry breaking in four-dimensional relativistic gauge theory and of the mechanism for the consistent generation of vector boson masses".

Professor Hagen's research interests are in the field of theoretical high-energy physics, primarily in the area of quantum field theory. This includes the formulation and quantization of higher spin field theories within the context of Galilean relativity as well as that of Special relativity. Work in recent years has been concerned with such topics as the soluble two-dimensional theories, Chern–Simons field theory, the Aharonov–Bohm effect, and the Casimir effect. In 2015, Hagen authored a paper that found the classic 17th century Wallis formula for  while calculating energy levels of the Hydrogen atom – the first paper to derive  from physics and quantum mechanics.

Born and raised in Chicago, Hagen received his B.S., M.S., and Ph.D. in physics from the Massachusetts Institute of Technology. At MIT, his doctoral thesis topic was in quantum electrodynamics.  He has been a professor of physics at the University of Rochester since 1963.  Professor Hagen won the Award for Excellence in Teaching, Department of Physics and Astronomy, University of Rochester twice (in 1996 and 1999).  Hagen is a Fellow of the American Physical Society and was named Outstanding Referee by APS in 2008.  Valparaiso University awarded Hagen the degree Honorary Doctor of Science in 2012 for his significant contributions to particle physics and the theory of mass generation.

See also
J. J. Sakurai Prize for Theoretical Particle Physics
Higgs mechanism
Higgs boson
Standard Model
Spontaneous symmetry breaking
1964 PRL symmetry breaking papers
MIT Physics Department
Norwegian Americans
Large Hadron Collider
Fermilab
Tevatron
Wallis product
The God Particle: If the Universe Is the Answer, What Is the Question?, a popular science book by Leon M. Lederman

References

External links

C.R. Hagen Faculty Page
Papers written by C.R. Hagen on Google Scholar
Papers written by C.R. Hagen on Spires abstract service
Physical Review Letters - 50th Anniversary Milestone Papers
Steven Weinberg Praises C.R. Hagen and Collaborators for Higgs Boson Theory
University of Rochester Physics - C.R. Hagen Wins 2010 J. J. Sakurai Prize for Theoretical Particle Physics
University of Rochester Sakurai Prize Press Release
C. Richard Hagen - 2010 J. J. Sakurai Prize Winner

"Scientists relish possible 'God particle' find." USA Today (July 3, 2012)
Hagen Calls CERN Findings a ‘Remarkable Achievement’ but Says More Work Is Needed
WXXI Rochester - Hagen, Demina, and Bodek interview
Hagen awaits Nobel Prize decision (October 7, 2013)
Hagen Considered For Nobel Prize (October 7, 2013)
Hagen disappointed in Nobel Prize decision (October 8, 2013)
Nobel Prize Eludes Hagen (October 8, 2013)
Economist on 2013 Nobel Prizes and GHK paper (October 12, 2013)
The Nobel Prize And The Rule Of Three. NPR Weekend Edition (December 14, 2013)
Englert-Brout-Higgs-Guralnik-Hagen-Kibble Mechanism on Scholarpedia
History of Englert-Brout-Higgs-Guralnik-Hagen-Kibble Mechanism on Scholarpedia
UR prof and Nobel candidate to speak at Rochester Museum & Science Center

American people of Norwegian descent
21st-century American physicists
Particle physicists
University of Rochester faculty
Living people
1937 births
Theoretical physicists
J. J. Sakurai Prize for Theoretical Particle Physics recipients
Fellows of the American Physical Society
MIT Department of Physics alumni